The  (corporately styled as N-BOX) is a kei car produced by Honda for the Japanese market. Together with the N-WGN, N-One and N-Van, it is part of the renewed N lineup of kei class city cars from Honda. The use of the letter "N" in the name was previously used for the late 1960s and 1970s N360.

, the N-Box has been the best-selling car in Japan for 28 consecutive months. It has been sold 1.7 million units since its introduction.



First generation (JF1/2; 2011) 

The first-generation N-Box was unveiled on 27 October 2011 and launched in Japan on 30 November 2011. The N-Box+ was released on 5 July 2012.

N-Box Slash (JF1/2; 2014) 

The N-Box Slash was a lower roof version of the N-Box released in December 2014. Unlike the regular N-Box, the Slash model had hinged rear doors.

Second generation (JF3/4; 2017) 

The second-generation N-Box was unveiled on 25 May 2017 and launched in Japan on 31 August 2017 via a livestream on YouTube. It went on sale on 1 September 2017.

Safety 
It is equipped with Honda Sensing technology which includes pre-collision assist with pedestrian detection, lane departure warning with lane keeping assist, ultrasonic mis-acceleration mitigation system and road sign assist.

Utility 
The N-Box's seats can slide front to back, recline, and tip up and down separately or both to accommodate passengers, long and tall cargo and its slope can be used as an under-storage compartment and ramp for PWD wheelchairs.

By removing the seat's headrest, its refresh mode can be used as a bed.

2021 facelift 
The second-generation N-Box received a facelift in late December 2020.

Awards 
 2017–2018 Car of the Year from Japan Automotive Hall of Fame
 2018 Technology of the Year Award from Automotive Researchers' and Journalists' Conference of Japan for weight reduction technology.

References

External links 

 

N-Box
Cars introduced in 2011
2020s cars
Microvans
Front-wheel-drive vehicles
All-wheel-drive vehicles
Vehicles with CVT transmission